Brandle may refer to:

 Brandle (card game), a German card game for 4 players
 Brändle, the surname, also sometimes spelt Brandle